Leonurus is a genus of flowering plants in the family Lamiaceae. It is native to Europe and Asia, naturalized in New Zealand, Hawaii, New Caledonia, and much of North and South America.

Leonurus japonicus is one of the 50 fundamental herbs used in traditional Chinese medicine. It is called yìmǔcǎo (益母草) in Chinese.

Species are sometimes confused with the related genus Leonotis.

 Species
 Leonurus cardiaca L. - much of northern + central Europe east to Western Siberia + Iran
 Leonurus chaituroides C.Y.Wu & H.W.Li - southeastern China (Anhui, Hubei, Hunan)
 Leonurus deminutus V.I.Krecz. - Siberia, Mongolia, Inner Mongolia
 Leonurus glaucescens Bunge - Turkey, Caucasus, Ukraine, European Russia, western Siberia (Altai and Western Siberia), Mongolia, Kazakhstan, Uzbekistan, Inner Mongolia
 Leonurus incanus  V.I.Krecz. & Kuprian. - Kazakhstan
 Leonurus japonicus Houtt. - Japan, Korea, Amur, Primorye, much of China (incl Taiwan, Tibet, Xinjiang), Himalayas, Southeast Asia, Queensland; naturalized in North + South America, West Indies, Hawaii, Cape Verde, etc.
 Leonurus kuprijanoviae Krestovsk. - Pakistan
 Leonurus macranthus Maxim. - Japan, Primorye, Manchuria
 Leonurus mongolicus  V.I.Krecz. & Kuprian. - Mongolia, parts of Siberia (Tuva + Chita)
 Leonurus nuristanicus Murata - Afghanistan
 Leonurus oblongifolius Popov  - Uzbekistan, Tajikistan, Kyrgyzstan
 Leonurus persicus Boiss. - Turkey, Iran, Caucasus
 Leonurus pseudomacranthus  Kitag. - Japan, Amur, Primorye, eastern China
 Leonurus pseudopanzerioides Krestovsk. - Mongolia, Xinjiang
 Leonurus pubescens Benth. - Afghanistan, Pakistan, Nepal, western Himalayas
 Leonurus quinquelobatus Gilib. - Turkey, Iran, Caucasus, Crimea; naturalized in Germany, Belgium, Irkutsk
 Leonurus royleanus Benth. - western Himalayas
 Leonurus sibiricus L. - Mongolia, Siberia (Altai, Chita), China (Hebei, Nei Mongol, Shaanxi, Shanxi)
 Leonurus tataricus L. - Siberia (Altai, Tuva, Western Siberia, Irkutsk)
 Leonurus tibeticus Krestovsk. - Tibet
 Leonurus turkestanicus  V.I.Krecz. & Kuprian. - western Himalayas, Tibet, Kyrgyzstan, Kazakhstan, Tajikistan, Turkmenistan, Uzbekistan, Iran
 Leonurus urticifolius C.Y.Wu & H.W.Li - Tibet
 Leonurus villosissimus  C.Y.Wu & H.W.Li - China (Hebei)
 Leonurus wutaishanicus C.Y.Wu & H.W.Li - China (Shanxi)

References

Lamiaceae
Lamiaceae genera
Taxa named by Carl Linnaeus